George Street is a major street located in the Brisbane CBD in Brisbane, Queensland, Australia.

Geography 
George Street extends from the Queensland University of Technology's Garden Point campus and City Botanic Gardens at its south-east end, through the commercial centre of Brisbane (Queen Street and Queen Street Mall), through to Roma Street railway station at its north-west end.

The State Parliament House building for the state of Queensland and Brisbane Square, as well as the Queen Elizabeth II Courts of Law and the State Law Building are found on the street. Queens Gardens, Treasury Building, Lands Administration Building and The Mansions are all located on George Street. Other office towers built on George Street include 111 George Street, 275 George Street and 400 George Street. At the northern end is the Roma Street railway station.

History
George Street as well as Queen Street, Wickham Street and the area known as Petrie Bight were unsealed and often dusty before 1899. In 1897, the North Brisbane Council held an election on whether a loan should be raised so the streets could be woodblocked. Agreement was given after a close decision by only a third of registered voters, however the results were limited as the surface was very slippery during the rain and buckled during heavy rains.

The first private residence in Brisbane, a weatherboard, low-ceilinged cottage, was built on George Street. The building remained intact into the 1880s but like similar early houses in the central business district they have been demolished and the land redeveloped.

In 1867, the Menzies Private Hotel was established at 28 George Street (corner of Margaret Street and adjacent to the Queensland Club). It was refurbished and re-opened as the Kingsley Private Hotel in July 1922. It has since been demolished.

The Bellevue Hotel opened on the western corner of George and Alice Streets . It served for many years as Brisbane's premier hotel. Without any prior public announcement, the Queensland Government demolished the building overnight on 20 April 1979.

In 1911, Queensland belatedly established its first university, the University of Queensland, in the Old Government House at the end of George Street. By the late 1930s,  the university outgrew this site, moving its main campus to St Lucia after World War II.

Heritage sites
George Street has a number of heritage-listed sites, including:
 2 George Street: the former Brisbane Central Technical College
 2 George Street: Old Government House
 19 George Street: Queensland Club
 40 George Street: The Mansions
 68 George Street: Harris Terrace
 110 George Street and 84 William Street: the former Queensland Government Printing Office
 142 George Street: Lands Administration Building and its First World War Honour Board
 144 George Street: Queens Gardens
 171 George Street: Family Services Building
 175 George Street: Treasury Hotel
 179 - 191 George Street (with frontages to Elizabeth Street): Hunters Buildings: Treasury Chambers, St Francis House, & Symons Building
 331 & 333 George Street: BAFS Building
 414 George Street: McDonnell & East Ltd Building
 468-482 George Street: Transcontinental Hotel
 Sections of Albert St, George St, William St, North Quay, Queen's Wharf Rd: Early Streets of Brisbane
 69 Alice Street: Parliament House (also faces onto George Street)

Queen's Wharf development 

The Queen's Wharf development of an entertainment precinct will be bounded by Queen Street, George Street, Alice Street and the Brisbane River (including all of William Street). All of the non-heritage buildings on the site will be demolished.

Gallery

Major intersections

 Alice Street
 Margaret Street
 Mary Street
 Charlotte Street
 Elizabeth Street
 Queen Street
 Adelaide Street
 Ann Street
 Turbot Street
 Tank Street
 Herschel Street
 Roma Street

See also

 Daniel Marquis, who operated a photographic studio at 82 George St.
 Brisbane Quarter, mixed use development at 300 George Street.

References

External links

 
Streets in Brisbane
Brisbane central business district